Björn Krupp (born March 6, 1991) is an American born-German professional ice hockey defenseman playing for Grizzlys Wolfsburg of the Deutsche Eishockey Liga (DEL). He is the son of former NHL defenseman Uwe Krupp.

Playing career

Early life
Krupp was born in Buffalo, New York when his father was a member of the NHL's Buffalo Sabres. Krupp spent time living in both the United States and Canada as a result of his father's career, but moved back to Germany with his mother after his parents' divorce in 1996. In 2002, he returned to North America, where his father was in his last NHL season with the Atlanta Thrashers at the time, and started playing ice hockey there at the age of eleven.

His early career included spells playing midget with TPH Thunder (2006–2007) and major junior hockey with Ontario Hockey League team, the Belleville Bulls (2008–2011).

Professional
Undrafted, in September 2011, he returned to Germany and signed for Kölner Haie of the Deutsche Eishockey Liga (DEL), where he was coached by his father.

In December 2014, Krupp went on loan to fellow Deutsche Eishockey Liga side Grizzly Adams Wolfsburg, before signing a two-year-deal at the club in April 2015.

In the midst of the 2018–19 season on November 17, 2018, Krupp agreed to a three-year contract with his third DEL club, Adler Mannheim, following the conclusion of his contract with Wolfsburg at seasons end.

On 13 May 2021, Krupp returned to former club, Grizzlys Wolfsburg, in signing as a free agent to a three-year contract through 2024.

International play

Krupp is a dual citizen of both Germany and the United States.

In 2007–08, Krupp was a member of the National Team Development Program representing the United States at the World U-17 Hockey Challenge.

On December 17, 2013, he made his senior international debut for Germany's men's national team in an exhibition game against Latvia.

Krupp later competed in the 2015 IIHF World Championship with Germany and saw action in seven games during the tournament. He also represented Germany at the 2018 IIHF World Championship.

Career statistics

Regular season and playoffs

International

References

External links

1991 births
Living people
Adler Mannheim players
Belleville Bulls players
Ice hockey people from Buffalo, New York
Kölner Haie players
Ice hockey players at the 2018 Winter Olympics
Medalists at the 2018 Winter Olympics
Olympic ice hockey players of Germany
Olympic medalists in ice hockey
Olympic silver medalists for Germany
Grizzlys Wolfsburg players